The Killing Ground is a fiction novel written by Jack Higgins in 2007.

Reception
Kirkus Reviews said "can any other thrillmeister equal the Higgins corpse-per-page count?".  Publishers Weekly said that "the proceedings are complicated; it helps if the reader is a veteran of this long-running series. But it's all pure Higgins: almost every shot hits square between the eyes, and all the characters are hard lads indeed."  David Pitt in his review for Booklist said that "the plot seems a bit forced" and that "there is nothing wrong with the novel, but there is nothing especially right about it".

Notes

2007 British novels
Novels by Jack Higgins
HarperCollins books